Karin Kennel (born 05 July 1995) is a Swiss tennis player. On 7 April 2014, she reached her highest WTA singles ranking of 409. On 30 July 2018, she peaked at No. 307 in the doubles rankings.

Career 
Chala had a successful junior career; her career-high world ranking as a junior was world No. 10. In 2013 Kennel partnering Belgian Elise Mertens won a prestigious tournament for juniors Abierto Juvenil Mexicano (Grade A) In 2012 played in the final in Osaka Mayor's Cup japan.

In 2013 European Junior Championships played the final she lost czech Barbora Krejčíková.

ITF junior results

Singles (3–5)

Doubles (3–4)

ITF finals

Singles: 10 (4 titles, 6 runner–up)

Doubles: 24 (10 titles, 14 runner–ups)

References

External links

 
 

1995 births
Living people
Swiss female tennis players